Karbabad is a village situated in the northern part of the Kingdom of Bahrain, along the northern coastline bordering the Persian Gulf. The village is famously known for being close to the location of the UNESCO World Heritage Site Qal'at al-Bahrain.  

The village was known for its beach, however in recent years, land reclamation has resulted in the once sea-front village to be up to 2 km inwards. Residents of the village have complained about land reclamation, claiming that "it is destroying their heritage".

References

Populated places in Bahrain